The following American politicians are members of the Communist Party USA (CPUSA) who have held elected office in the United States.

The CPUSA used to field candidates under its own banner, or under the banner of a third party, such as the Nonpartisan League.

Current elected officials

Former elected officials

See also 
 List of socialist members of the United States Congress

References 

Socialism-related lists
Lists of political office-holders in the United States
History of the Communist Party USA